Pat O'Connor born 9 December 1938, was a professional footballer for Kilmarnock Football Club.

References

1938 births
Living people
Scottish footballers
Association football wing halves
Kilmarnock F.C. players
Chicago Spurs players
Scottish Football League players
Scottish expatriate sportspeople in the United States
Expatriate soccer players in the United States
Scottish expatriate footballers